Blasius Höfel (27 May 1792 – 17 September 1863) was an Austrian copper engraver.

Life 

Born in Vienna, Höfel studied drawing and painting from 1805 at the Akademie der bildenden Künste Wien with Hubert Maurer. From 1807 he devoted himself primarily to chalcography. His most famous work is a portrait of Ludwig van Beethoven, with whom he also had personal contact. From 1820 to 1837 he worked as a drawing teacher at the military academy in Wiener Neustadt. On a study trip to Germany he met  and afterwards he worked with different woodcut techniques. Around 1840 he invented the line etching.

Höfel died in Aigen bei Salzburg at the age of 71.

Literature 
 Constantin von Wurzbach: Höfel, Blasius. In Biographisches Lexikon des Kaiserthums Oesterreich 9th part. Kaiserlich-königliche Hof- und Staatsdruckerei, Vienna 1863,  Höfel, Blasius Online
 Josef Wünsch: Blasius Höfel. Geschichte seines Lebens und seiner Kunst und Verzeichnis seiner Werke, Gesellschaft für vervielfältigende Kunst, Wien 1910 (Online-Version)

References

External links 

Austrian engravers
Artists from Vienna
1792 births
1863 deaths